Saint-Rustice is a commune in the Haute-Garonne department in southwestern France.

History
Saint-Rustice is famous for its ancient Roman mosaics which were discovered in 1833. The city takes its name from Rusticus, a bishop of Cahors, who was murdered in 630.

Population

Sights

See also
Communes of the Haute-Garonne department

References

Communes of Haute-Garonne